Blazh (also released under the title of  ) is the debut studio album by Nikolai Noskov, released in 1998 in Russia.

Album information and production 
All music written by Nikolai Noskov unless otherwise stated.

Track listing

References

External links

Nikolai Noskov albums
1998 debut albums
Russian-language albums